The 2016–17 San Jose Sharks season was the 26th season for the National Hockey League franchise that was established on May 9, 1990. The Sharks failed to repeat their success of winning the Western Conference in 2016 after losing to Edmonton in the first round in six games.

Standings

Schedule

Pre-season
The preseason schedule was announced on June 16, 2016.

Regular season
The schedule was announced on June 21, 2016.

Playoffs

The Sharks entered the playoffs as the Pacific Division's third seed and will face the second seed of the same division, the Edmonton Oilers.

Player statistics
Skaters

Goaltenders

†Denotes player spent time with another team before joining the Sharks.  Stats reflect time with the Sharks only.
‡Traded mid-season

Transactions
The Sharks have been involved in the following transactions during the 2016–17 season:

Trades

Free agents acquired

Free agents lost

Lost via waivers

Player signings

Draft picks

Below are the San Jose Sharks' selections at the 2016 NHL Entry Draft, held on June 24 and 25, 2016, at the First Niagara Center in Buffalo.

Awards

References

San Jose Sharks seasons
San Jose Sharks
San Jose Sharks
San Jose Sharks